Okabe may refer to:

 Okabe (surname), a Japanese surname
 Okabe, Shizuoka, a former town in Japan that was merged into the expanded city of Fujieda
 Okabe, Saitama, a former town in Japan that was merged into the expanded city of Fukaya
 Okabe Station, a railway station in Fukaya, Saitama Prefecture, Japan
 Okabe (mountain), a Pyrenean summit in the Basse-Navarre province of the Basque country in France
 Merauke, a town in the Papua province of Indonesia, which is labeled "Okabe" on some maps
Okabe (food), ancient Japanese word for Tofu